The Gizmondo is a handheld gaming console developed by Tiger Telematics. It was released in the UK, Sweden and the U.S. starting in March 2005. Its first-party games were developed in studios in Helsingborg, Sweden, and Manchester, England. Gizmondo Europe, Ltd. was based in London, England, and was a subsidiary of Florida-based Tiger Telematics, whose chairman Carl Freer led Gizmondo's development.

Before its launch, the Gizmondo had high expectations by some journalists due to its extensive feature set, and it was aimed to compete against Nintendo and Sony; it ended up as a major sales failure. The company extravagantly spent millions on promotions such as a celebrity party at London's Park Lane Hotel, and taking part at the 24 Hours of Le Mans, despite never making a profit. Its American debut was delayed several times, and a widescreen version was announced shortly before its release – resulting in low sales. With fewer than 25,000 units sold, the Gizmondo was named by GamePro as the worst selling handheld console in history.

The Gizmondo was further overshadowed when Swedish press revealed criminal pasts of several executives, causing their resignations including Tiger Telematics CEO Carl Freer. Director of Gizmondo Europe Stefan Eriksson was involved in a Swedish criminal organisation, the "Uppsalamaffian" (the Uppsala mafia). By February 2006, the company was forced into bankruptcy after amassing US$300 million (£160 million) debt, and the Gizmondo stopped production. Weeks thereafter Eriksson crashed a rare Ferrari Enzo driving at 260 km/h (162 mph) in California, and was later jailed and subsequently deported for driving under the influence in connection with the crash and other criminal offenses.

History
The Gizmondo device was originally called Gametraq. Tiger Telematics first published on their website in October 2003 about the device being developed. This came in response to Nokia's N-Gage. During December that year, Gizmondo made its debut as a concept product at the Las Vegas CES in January 2004, and later appeared at the German CeBIT show in March 2004. The company and the console were renamed Gizmondo around April 2004.

British Formula One driver Jenson Button appeared on magazine adverts for the Gizmondo, and also had his own licensed video game for the device, Chicane, though it never released due to a dispute with Tiger Telematics and the developer of the game. In London's Regent Street, Tiger Telematics threw a party with several celebrities invited to promote the device. Busta Rhymes, Jodie Kidd and Pharrell Williams were among the celebrities invited, of whom some performed. There were also two television adverts that aired after release. Also, in an attempt to promote the console, Gizmondo's executive Stefan Eriksson took part in the 24 Hours of Le Mans race of 2005 in a Gizmondo-sponsored Ferrari 360 Modena GTC.

The Gizmondo's problems were compounded by the involvement of Eriksson in Swedish organized crime, and later for crashing a Ferrari Enzo in Malibu, California, which was apparently owned by the Royal Bank of Scotland. He pleaded guilty to numerous criminal charges which led him to 2 years in jail.

In 2007, GameTrailers named it "the worst console of all time."

Widescreen Gizmondo
Tiger Telematics announced a new Gizmondo model for release in Q2 2006. It was intended to have a larger, 4" widescreen screen and upgrades like Wi-Fi, TV-out support, an improved 480 × 272 pixel resolution, a 2-megapixel camera, and a 500 MHz processor. It also included tri-band GSM technology, effectively making it a mobile phone too. It also featured new icons on the buttons. The widescreen Gizmondo was announced just a few weeks before the U.S. launch of the Gizmondo, possibly prompting some potential customers to not buy the Gizmondo, and instead wait for the improved model, in an example of the Osborne effect. Tiger Telematics promised to show the device at CES 2006 in January; however, it never appeared there. Shortly thereafter Tiger went bankrupt, and thus the new Gizmondo was never released.

Release

United Kingdom
Gizmondo was released in the United Kingdom on 19 March 2005, priced at £229.  The Gizmondo was available from the Gizmondo flagship store on London's Regent Street, via Gizmondo's online shop, and other high-street and online retailers such as Argos, Dixons, Currys, John Lewis, although it was never clear how many units were actually introduced into those retail channels.

The SMS service of the Gizmondo enabled people to send messages by pre-pay Vodafone accounts bundled in with the device.

The Gizmondo sold 1000 units within an hour of launch. In April, a month after the initial release, a variant of the console with GPS-assisted "Smart Adds" advertising enabled was released with an RRP of £129.

Sweden
Gizmondo was launched in Sweden in the late Summer of 2005, with both "Smart Adds" and normal units available. Rather than opening flagship stores, the manufacturer relied on established retailers such as Webhallen. "Smart Adds" were never enabled for the Swedish market, even though the technology "was there".

United States

In the United States, the Gizmondo launched on October 22, 2005. Retail price was $400 for a unit without "Smart Ads", or $229 for a "Smart Ads" enabled device. It was available only at kiosks located in shopping malls throughout the U.S. (operated by National Kiosk, LLC, located in the western corner of North Carolina). Only 8 of the planned 14 games were ever released in the U.S., along with no CoPilot GPS software, though the software was sold on the British site for a week or two. There was little to no advertising, and some of their advertising was even put in magazines of Nintendo Power (Nintendo's official magazine). Plans to distribute the handheld through other retailers never materialized.

Games

The Gizmondo launched in the United Kingdom with only one game, Trailblazer. The console launched in the United States with a line-up of eight titles, including Trailblazer. In addition to these eight, six others were released in Europe only. A further 30 titles were known to have been in development for the system, but all were canceled before their release due to Tiger Telematics' bankruptcy. Also all games released in North America were effectively launch titles.

Certain games were claimed to be capable of using "augmented reality", most notably the unreleased game Colors. It was intended to be the first GPS video game, with the ability to track a user's real world movements in real time. Additionally several games including Motocross 2005, Hockey Rage 2005, and Sticky Balls had bluetooth multiplayer features. The accessibility to purchase Gizmondo games was limited. In the United States, games were only available through a small numbers of kiosks located in shopping malls across the country. After Tiger Telematic's bankruptcy, the Gizmondo and its games were left without any proper marketing or distribution.

Fan site Gizmondo Central reviewed all games, and Trailblazer and SSX 3 had the best score. Sticky Balls and FIFA Football 2005 were second-best.

Smart Adds
The "Smart Adds" system was intended as a way for advertisers to subsidize part of the cost of the unit. The apparent misspelling of the name was intentional and a trademark and company name were registered in the UK as "Smart Adds", though even Tiger Telematics occasionally slipped up and referred to it as Smart Ads in their publicity material. A "Smart Adds"-enabled Gizmondo cost less (£129/$229), but would display advertisements on the Gizmondo's screen at random intervals when the user entered the home screen. These advertisements would be downloaded via the device's GPRS data connection, and would be targeted based on data inputted to the device. A maximum of three ads would be shown per day. Some ads would include special offers in the form of vouchers or barcodes, and some would utilize the device's GPS system to direct users to the nearest store carrying the advertised product.

However, the "Smart Adds" service was never activated, and users who paid the reduced price for a "Smart Adds"-enabled device did not receive any advertisements through their device.

Technical specifications

 Display: 72 mm (2.8 inch) TFT screen
 Resolution: 320 × 240 pixels
 CPU: Samsung ARM9 processor running at 400 MHz
 Graphics: Nvidia GoForce 3D 4500
 Graphics RAM: 1.2 MB 128-bit SRAM
 Graphics Performance: 1,000,000 polygons per second
 RAM: 128 MB 16-bit DDR
 ROM: 64 MB
 Sound: Built-in speaker
 Communication: Bluetooth class 2 for multiplayer gaming, GSM tri-band
 Ports: Stereo headset socket, Mini-USB client, SD flash card reader
 Power: Removable battery
 Temperature Range: 
 OS: Windows CE
 Multimedia: MPEG 4 video playback, ability to play back MP3, WAV and MIDI files via Windows Media Player 9
 JPEG camera
 Removable SIM card
 GPS tracking application
 GPRS mapping application
 GPRS Class 10
 SMS
 MMS receive and send
 WAP 2.0
 Polyphonic ring tones
 Flight mode

Successor
Former Gizmondo director Carl Freer announced to a Swedish newspaper in November 2007 his intentions for a new Gizmondo, and said there were already 35 games in place, a manufacturing base in Shenzhen, China, and that he hoped the handheld would retail at US$99.

The original planned launch date was May 2008, but this was quickly pushed back to November 2008, along with details of a new company, Media Power, behind the launch, headed by Carl Freer and his Swedish partner Mikael Ljungman, with development apparently proceeding according to the new schedule at least until September. By December 2008, the console had still not appeared, which Freer blamed on the difficult economic conditions. The device was delayed to 2009 as a result. The latest design prototype turned it into a smartphone running both Windows CE or Google Android.

However, since then the Media Power website went offline. Co-founder Mikael Ljungman was later arrested, extradited to Denmark and convicted of serious fraud due to his activities at IT Factory. Nothing more has been announced about the device by Freer, effectively confirming its cancellation.

In popular culture
A reference to the Gizmondo is made in the British movie Goal!, when a meeting takes place in a Gizmondo store.

References

External links

 
Products introduced in 2005
Handheld game consoles
ARM-based video game consoles